Boris Lvovich Feigin (born 20 November 1953) is a Russian mathematician. His research has spanned representation theory, mathematical physics, algebraic geometry, Lie groups and Lie algebras, conformal field theory, homological and homotopical algebra.

In 1969 Feigin graduated from the Moscow Mathematical School No. 2 (Andrei Zelevinsky was among his classmates). From 1969 until 1974 he was a student in the Faculty of Mechanics and Mathematics at Moscow State University (MSU) under joint supervision of Dmitry Fuchs and Israel Gelfand. His diploma thesis was dedicated to characteristic classes of flags of foliations. Feigin was not accepted to the graduate school of MSU due to increasingly anti-semitic policies at that institution at that time. After working as a computer programmer in industry for some time, he was accepted in 1976 to the graduate school of Yaroslavl State University and defended his thesis "Cohomology of current Lie algebras on smooth manifolds" in 1981 at Steklov Institute in Leningrad. He was an invited speaker at the International Congress of Mathematicians in Kyoto in 1990. He obtained his habilitation in 1995.

Boris Feigin is a professor at the Independent University of Moscow and a senior research fellow at Landau Institute for Theoretical Physics since 1992. Since 2009, he is a professor of the Faculty of Mathematics at the Higher School of Economics (HSE). In 2013 he was promoted to Distinguished professor at HSE. Since 2014, he is the head of the Laboratory of Representation Theory and Mathematical Physics at HSE.

Boris Feigin is a member of the editorial boards of mathematics journals Functional Analysis and Its Applications, Moscow Mathematical Journal, Transformation groups.

References

External links 
 Boris Feigin home page at Landau Institute for Theoretical Physics
 
 Boris Feigin's articles on the Arxiv

1953 births
20th-century Russian mathematicians
21st-century Russian mathematicians
Living people
Soviet mathematicians
Academic staff of the Higher School of Economics
Academic staff of the Independent University of Moscow
Moscow State University alumni